Matteo Montaguti (born 6 January 1984) is an Italian former professional racing cyclist, who rode professionally between 2008 and 2019 for the , ,  and  teams.

Major results

2003
 3rd  Points race, UEC European Under-23 Track Championships
2005
 1st  Points race, National Track Championships
2006
 7th Tour du Jura
 9th Gran Premio della Liberazione
2007
 1st  Team pursuit, National Track Championships
 6th Trofeo Franco Balestra
 8th Trofeo Città di Brescia
2008
 2nd Gran Premio Industria e Commercio Artigianato Carnaghese
2010
 1st  Overall Giro della Provincia di Reggio Calabria
1st Stage 1
 3rd Gran Premio Nobili Rubinetterie
 5th Trofeo Laigueglia
 6th Memorial Marco Pantani
 10th Gran Premio Città di Misano – Adriatico
2011
 3rd Gran Premio Industria e Commercio di Prato
2012
 1st  Mountains classification Critérium International
 1st  Mountains classification Tour de Suisse
 3rd Trofeo Laigueglia
2014
 2nd Gran Premio Città di Camaiore
 7th Trofeo Laigueglia
2015
 3rd Gran Premio di Lugano
 4th Trofeo Laigueglia
 7th Gran Premio Bruno Beghelli
 8th Gran Premio Nobili Rubinetterie
2016
 9th Trofeo Laigueglia
2017
 1st Stage 4 Tour of the Alps
2019
 8th GP Industria & Artigianato di Larciano
 10th Overall Settimana Internazionale di Coppi e Bartali

Grand Tour general classification results timeline

References

External links

Matteo Montaguti profile at Ag2r-La Mondiale

1984 births
Living people
Italian male cyclists
People from Forlì
Cyclists from Emilia-Romagna
Sportspeople from the Province of Forlì-Cesena